Edwige Diaz (born 15 October 1987) is a French politician of the National Rally.

Biography 
Edwige Diaz was born on 15 October 1987. Her grandfather was a Spaniard and a communist activist. After leaving high school, Diaz studied for a Master's degree in languages.

Diaz was a member of the Union for a Popular Movement at college before joining the National Rally. In June 2017, as a National Rally candidate for the legislative election in the Gironde's 11th constituency (north of Bordeaux), she obtained 23.7% of votes in the first round, and then 42.98% in the second round, losing to LREM's Véronique Hammerer.

She is a regional councillor of Nouvelle-Aquitaine.

In 2020, she was a candidate in the municipal elections of Saint-Savin. She received 43.80% of the vote.

In 2021, she is the candidate of her party to lead the Region Nouvelle-Aquitaine. During the 2022 French legislative election, she was elected to the National Assembly for Gironde's 11th constituency defeating Véronique Hammerer.

References

1987 births
Living people
Deputies of the 16th National Assembly of the French Fifth Republic
Women members of the National Assembly (France)
Members of the Regional Council of Nouvelle-Aquitaine
Politicians from Nouvelle-Aquitaine
French people of Spanish descent
National Rally (France) politicians
21st-century French women politicians